Koona is a village and rural commune in Niger.

Koona is also a common misspelling and mispronunciation of the Idaho city "Kuna"

References

Communes of Maradi Region